Malieveld (Dutch pronunciation: , literally "pall-mall field") is a large grass field in the city center of The Hague, Netherlands, located opposite the central train station. The field is widely known in the Netherlands for being the location of many large-scale demonstrations. It is also used for festivals, funfairs, concerts and other big events.

Gallery

See also
 Haagse Bos
 Museumplein
 Champ de Mars

References

Parks in South Holland
Urban public parks